Gregorio Gómez Álvarez (14 February 1927 – 24 March 2015), better known as El Tepa Gómez, was a Mexican soccer player who played in the position of lateral defense right and later as central. He played for the C.D. Guadalajara, Atlas F.C. and for the Pumas de la UNAM.

Trajectory

C.D. Guadalajara 

He arrived at C.D. Guadalajara, drawn from the local team of his city, Club Tepatitlán (amateur), in the second half of the 1940s, making his debut when the Hungarian Jorge Orth was as coach, making his debut on 15 February 1948, in a game against Club Tampico held in Tampico, Tamaulipas.

His great stature and good football made it very difficult to pass him in the aerial plays, a factor that made him reach the Mexico National Team in which he played in international tournaments and a World Cup.

Atlas F.C. 
He left rojiblanco in August 1954, when his card as a player was released by the club, which would be used by Atlas F.C. who hired him to play with rojinegra.

PUMAS de la UNAM 
Finally in 1960 he would play with the Pumas de la UNAM in this team. He culminated his career as a professional soccer player, obtaining excellent sporting results in the different clubs in which he was a member.

México Fútbol Team 

He made his debut with the Mexico National Team on 25 September 1949, in the II North American and Caribbean Cup, at the Sports City stadium in Mexico City.
He was one of the first C.D. Guadalajara players to play in a Soccer World Cup, he was summoned along with his teammates Max Prieto and Rodrigo Ruiz for the 1950 World Cup.

However, Gómez and Ruiz were the only ones to play since Prieto would stay on the bench, Gómez played the second game against Yugoslavia and the third game against Switzerland. He was also nominated to participate in the 1954 World Cup but was not in the final call.

Participations in World Cups

Stadium in his Honor 

In Tepatitlán de Morelos, the Municipal Government commemorated him by naming the local stadium the Stadium Tepa Gómez, said stadium that still retains its name and location; where his childhood and youth team plays.

It was inaugurated in September 1970, with the match between Club Tepatitlán vs C.D. Guadalajara with a score of 0–3 in favor of Guadalajara, with 3,200 spectators. With the presence of authorities from the Mexican Football Federation, the Municipal and State Government, in addition to the presence of Gregorio Gómez el "Tepa" † who was named in his honor the stadium, which together with the authorities cut the opening thread .

Clubs

References

External links
FIFA profile

1921 births
Mexico international footballers
Association football defenders
C.D. Guadalajara footballers
Footballers from Jalisco
1950 FIFA World Cup players
1988 deaths
Mexican footballers